Callionymus octostigmatus, the eightspot dragonet, is a species of dragonet native to the central western Pacific Ocean where it occurs at depths of from .  This species grows to a length of  TL.

References 

O
Fish described in 1981